Pvt. Martin or Private Martin may refer to:
 Private Eva Martin, high school teacher, killed during attacks on the Ulster Defence Regiment by Sean O'Callaghan
 Sgt. James Martin II, USMC (1826–1895)
 Private Martin, a playable character in Call of Duty

See also
 Martin (name)